Batman is the eleventh studio album by American recording artist Prince and the soundtrack album to the 1989 film Batman. It was released on June 20, 1989, by Warner Bros. Records. As a Warner Bros. stablemate, Prince's involvement in the soundtrack was designed to leverage the media company's contract bound talent as well as fulfill the artist's need for a commercial revival. The result was yet another multi platinum successful cross media enterprise by Warner Bros., in the vein of Purple Rain.

The album stayed at number one on the Billboard 200 for six consecutive weeks, being his first number one album since Around the World in a Day, while its lead single, "Batdance", became his first number one song since "Kiss". It is certified double platinum by the Recording Industry Association of America (RIAA).

Production
The album was recorded in six weeks, from mid February to late March 1989, and Prince used three tracks recorded earlier: "Electric Chair", "Scandalous!", and "Vicki Waiting" (originally known as "Anna Waiting", named for his then girlfriend Anna Fantastic). Originally, the songs "1999" and "Baby I'm a Star" from earlier albums were slated to be used in the film, but Prince instead recorded an entire album's worth of material with Batman samples and lyrics. In a 2001 Rolling Stone interview, Prince revealed that the project was initially supposed to be a collaboration between himself and Michael Jackson: "Did you know that the album was supposed to be a duet between Michael Jackson and me? He as Batman, me as the Joker?" Prince would have sung funk songs for the villains, while Michael Jackson would have sung ballads for the heroes. This never came to fruition as Jackson was busy with his Bad World Tour and already signed with Epic Records (the label he had been with since 1975), while the film was a Warner Bros. production. The album was performed entirely by Prince, with a few exceptions: Sheena Easton duets with Prince on "The Arms of Orion", "Trust" features a sampled horn part by Eric Leeds and Atlanta Bliss, and "The Future" features strings by Clare Fischer sampled from the then unreleased 1986 track "Crystal Ball" and samples of the Sounds of Blackness choir. "Batdance" includes a sample of Prince's technician Matthew Larson, and "Partyman" features the vocal performance of then girlfriend Anna Garcia (credited as Anna Fantastic). All dialogue sampled on Prince's Batman album is taken directly from a workprint of Batman and therefore lacks ADR and foley. This is especially noticeable in the beginning of the first track, "The Future", with dialogue of Michael Keaton speaking as Batman.

In the album's liner notes, the lyrics of each song are associated with one of the characters in the film: "The Future" and "Scandalous" are credited to Batman; while "Electric Chair" and "Trust" are credited to the Joker. "Vicki Waiting" is sung from the perspective of Bruce Wayne, while "Lemon Crush" comes from Vicki Vale; the two characters share the duet, "The Arms of Orion". "Partyman" was inspired by Prince's first meeting with Jack Nicholson (out-of-character) on-set.

"Batdance", whose lyrics consist mostly of samples from the film, is credited to all aforementioned parties, as well as Gemini, Prince's Batman centric alter ego that resembles Batman villain Two-Face—Prince on the right half of the body and the Joker on the left. Prince himself is credited with singing two lines of the album as himself: "Who do you trust if you can't trust God? Who can you trust—who can ya? Nobody" in "Trust"; and the word "STOP!" which ends "Batdance" and the album proper (though the "STOP!" is actually a sound bite of Michael Keaton, directly from the film where he tells the Batmobile to stop).

The Batman era also marked a change in Prince's appearance; he switched out the elaborate costumes, polka dots and lace from Lovesexy for much simpler attire, usually donning dark blue/black clothing and "Batman" boots. The artist's hair was fully straightened from his signature wavy curls, as shown in the "Batdance" video.

Reception

In 2016, film critic Matt Zoller Seitz praised Prince's songs and music videos for Batman, more so than the film itself, stating that his songs "suggest a goofy, perverse, sensuous, somewhat introverted Batman film that so far we've never gotten from anyone", and arguing that Prince's music videos "are more psychologically perceptive than any of the Batman films".

In 2019, a Symposium took place to discuss the album.

Ownership complexities
Prince had to agree to sign the publishing rights to the songs used in the film over to Warner Bros.; Prince's hit singles from this album were not permitted to appear on any of his hits compilations until the 2016 release of 4Ever, which included "Batdance". Only the B-sides "200 Balloons", "Feel U Up", and "I Love U in Me" appeared on his 1993 The Hits/The B-Sides collection. On concert T-shirts which listed all of Prince's album titles to date, the song "Scandalous!" appeared in place of the album Batman. Despite this, Prince performed a number of the album's tracks in concert over the years. A 2005 special edition DVD of the Batman film contains Prince's related videos as a bonus feature (although the video for "Partyman" is an edited down version of the original seven-minute long video).

Track listing
All songs written by Prince, except where noted.

Personnel
Prince – lead vocals, guitar, bass, keyboards, drums, percussion 
Candy Dulfer : saxophone
Eric Leeds – saxophone (6)
Atlanta Bliss – trumpet (6) 
Sounds of Blackness – choir (1) 
Sheena Easton – co-lead vocals (3) 
Clare Fischer – orchestration (1)

Singles and Hot 100 chart placings
"Batdance" (#1 US, #1 US R&B, #2 UK)
"Batdance" (edit)
"200 Balloons"
"Batdance" (The Batmix) (maxi single)
"Batdance" (Vicki Vale Mix) (maxi single)

"Partyman" (#18 US, #5 US R&B, #14 UK)
"Partyman"
"Feel U Up"
"The Purple Party Mix" (maxi single)
"Partyman" (music mix) (maxi single)
"Partyman" (video mix) (maxi single)

"The Arms of Orion"
"The Arms of Orion" with Sheena Easton (#36 US, #27 UK)
"I Love U in Me"

"Scandalous!" (US) (#5 US R&B)
"Scandalous!"
"When 2 R in Love"
"The Crime" ("The Scandalous Sex Suite" maxi single)
"The Passion" ("The Scandalous Sex Suite" maxi single)
"The Rapture" ("The Scandalous Sex Suite" maxi single)
"Sex" ("The Scandalous Sex Suite" maxi single)

"The Future" (UK/Germany)
"The Future" (Remix)
"Electric Chair" (Remix)

Charts

Weekly charts

Year-end charts

Certifications

References

External links
Batman at Discogs
 

1989 soundtrack albums
1980s film soundtrack albums
Albums produced by Prince (musician)
Batman (1989 film series)
Batman film soundtracks
Prince (musician) albums
Prince (musician) soundtracks
Warner Records soundtracks
1989 albums
Albums recorded in a home studio
Warner Records albums